Paristan is the term that refers to home of peris, used in Persian cosmology.

Paristan may also refer to:
 Paristan (film), a 1994 Indian-Hindi language film
 Paristan (TV series), a 2022 Pakistani television series
 Paristan Lake, a lake discovered in 2018 in Pakistan